Phulia railway station is a railway station of the Kolkata Suburban Railway system and operated by Eastern Railway. It is situated beside National Highway 34 at Chatkatala, Phulia on the Ranaghat–Shantipur line in Nadia district in the Indian state of West Bengal. The distance between Sealdah to Phulia railway station is approximately 89 km.

History
The line including Phulia railway station was doubled in 2014–15 and electrified in 1964–65.

References 

Sealdah railway division
Railway stations in Nadia district
Kolkata Suburban Railway stations